Tremont Avenue may refer to:
Tremont Avenue, a street in The Bronx, New York

Any of several New York City Subway stations:

Tremont Avenue (IND Concourse Line), serving the  trains
Tremont Avenue–177th Street (IRT Third Avenue Line), now demolished
West Farms Square–East Tremont Avenue (IRT White Plains Road Line), serving the  train
Westchester Square–East Tremont Avenue (IRT Pelham Line), serving the  trains